Shindler is an unincorporated community and census-designated place (CDP) in Lincoln County, South Dakota, United States. The population was 607 at the 2020 census.

Geography
Shindler is located in the northeastern corner of Lincoln County at  (43.474976, -96.648658).

Spring Creek flows eastward through the southern part of the CDP, leading to the Big Sioux River.

Demographics

History
The community has the name of Charles Shindler, a settler.

References

Census-designated places in Lincoln County, South Dakota
Census-designated places in South Dakota